James Hynes (born August 23, 1955) is an American novelist.

Biography 
Hynes was born in Okemos, Michigan, and grew up in Big Rapids, Michigan. He currently resides in Austin, Texas, where he has taught creative writing at the University of Texas. He has also taught at the Iowa Writers' Workshop, the University of Michigan, Miami University, and Grinnell College. Hynes received a B.A. in philosophy from the University of Michigan and an M.F.A. from the Iowa Writers' Workshop at the University of Iowa.

His first novel, The Wild Colonial Boy, deals with terrorism in Northern Ireland. Hynes' three subsequent books, Publish and Perish, The Lecturer's Tale and Kings of Infinite Space, combine satire and horror. His most recent novel, Next, was published in 2010. His reviews and literary essays have appeared in The Washington Post, The New York Times, Boston Review, and the online magazine Salon. In the 1980s he wrote about television for the Michigan Voice, Mother Jones, and In These Times.

Works
 The Wild Colonial Boy (Atheneum, 1990)
 Publish and Perish: Three Tales of Tenure and Terror (Picador USA, 1997)
 The Lecturer's Tale (Picador USA, 2001)
 Kings of Infinite Space (St. Martin's Press, 2004)
 Next (Little, Brown and Company, 2010)

References

External links
 

20th-century American novelists
Novelists from Michigan
University of Texas at Austin faculty
University of Michigan faculty
Miami University faculty
University of Iowa faculty
University of Iowa alumni
University of Michigan College of Literature, Science, and the Arts alumni
University of Michigan fellows
Grinnell College faculty
Writers from Austin, Texas
1955 births
Living people
Iowa Writers' Workshop alumni
People from Big Rapids, Michigan
21st-century American novelists
American male novelists
Believer Book Award winners
People from Okemos, Michigan
20th-century American male writers
21st-century American male writers
Novelists from Texas
Novelists from Ohio
Novelists from Iowa